Ri Kwang-ok (born 27 July 1996) is a North Korean athlete. She competed in the women's marathon event at the 2019 World Athletics Championships.

References

External links

1996 births
Living people
North Korean female long-distance runners
North Korean female marathon runners
Place of birth missing (living people)
World Athletics Championships athletes for North Korea
20th-century North Korean women
21st-century North Korean women